K + J.J. (also released as "Nuf Said") is an album by American jazz trombonists J. J. Johnson and Kai Winding featuring performances recorded in 1955 for the Bethlehem label.

Reception

AllMusic awarded the album 4½ stars and in its review by Stephen Cook, he states that "the arrangements and playing are so engaging and of such high quality that categorization dilemmas disappear. A fine disc".

Track listing
 "Out of This World" (Harold Arlen, Johnny Mercer) - 2:20
 "Thou Swell" (Richard Rodgers, Lorenz Hart) - 2:55 	
 "Lover" (Rogers, Hart) - 5:34
 "Lope City" (J. J. Johnson) - 3:32
 "Stolen Bass" (Johnson) - 2:56
 "It's All Right With Me" (Cole Porter) - 5:06
 "Mad About the Boy" (Noël Coward) - 3:32
 "Yes Sir, That's My Baby" (Walter Donaldson, Gus Kahn) - 4:06
 "That's How I Feel About You" (Kai Winding) - 3:59
 "Gong Rock" (Winding) - 3:25
 "It's All Right With Me" [alternate take 15] (Porter) - 5:31
 "Lover" [alternate take] (Rogers, Hart) - 5:39
 "Gong Rock" [alternate take] (Winding) - 3:25
 "Lope City" [alternate take 11] (Johnson) - 3:42
 "It's All Right With Me" [alternate take 11] (Porter) - 6:24 	
 "Out of This World" [alternate take] (Arlen, Mercer) - 2:28
 "That's How I Feel About You" [alternate take] (Winding) - 4:08 
Recorded in New York City on January 26, 1955 (tracks 2, 4, 6, 11, 14 & 15) and January 26 and 27, 1955 (tracks 1, 3, 5, 7-10, 12, 13, 16 & 17)

Personnel
J. J. Johnson, Kai Winding – trombone
Dick Katz – piano
Milt Hinton (tracks 1, 3, 5, 7-10, 12, 13, 16 & 17), Wendell Marshall (tracks 2, 4, 6, 11, 14 & 15) – bass
Al Harewood – drums

References

Bethlehem Records albums
J. J. Johnson albums
Kai Winding albums
1955 albums